Guité or Guite is a surname. Notable people with the name include:

 Ben Guité (born 1978), Canadian ice hockey player
 Charles Guité (born 1943 or 1944), Canadian civil servant
 Jean-François Guité (1852–1917), Canadian politician
 Malcolm Guite (born 1957), English poet, singer-songwriter, priest, and academic
 Marie-Guite Dufay (born 1949), French politician 
 Pierre Guité (born 1952), Canadian ice hockey player
 Suzanne Guité (1927–1981), Canadian artist

See also
 Guite people, a major family-group among the Kuki people.